Aldeia do Mato is a former freguesia ("civil parish"), located in the municipality of Abrantes, in Santarém District, Portugal. In 2013, the parish merged into the new parish Aldeia do Mato e Souto. The population in 2011 was 441, in an area of 31.68 km².

History
The parish had its beginning in the 13th century, when the area was then referred to as Aldeia da Mata, and recognized for the quantity of wood gathered in the district (aldeia da mata is Portuguese for hamlet of the hinterland). It was also recognized for the land rents obtained from cultivation and harvesting of olive and pine trees.

The parochial church, dedicated to Santa Maria Madalena had its origin in the 18th century.

A marble cross was located near the two fountains of São João and São José, and later restored in 1850.

The construction of the Barregem do Castelo do Bode (Castelo do Bode Dam) in 1951, caused the disappearance of the fields of olive trees which were lost to make way for the new reservoir.

Geography

The parish is located in the northeastern part of the municipality, neighboring the parishes of Souto (to the northeast and east), Martinchel (to the west), São Vicente (in the east) and Rio de Moinhos (along the west) and with the municipalities of Tomar (to the north) and Constância (to the east). It contains the localities Aldeia do Mato, Bairros Cimeiro, Cabeça Gorda, Carreira do Mato, Casinha, Fundeiro, Medroa, Pucariça, Vale de Chões and Vale Manso.

Ecoregions/Protected areas
 Recreational and Leisure Nautical Park of Aldeia do Mato, opened from 1 May to 31 October, the recreational park is concentrated on the Castelo do Bode Reservoir. The Recreational and Leisure Nautical Park attracts tourists from within the country, owing to biodiversity (that includes various species of wild pine, eucalyptus, strawberry tree, heather, olive trees), water sports (swimming, sailing, kayaking, canoeing, windsurfing), and recent developments that have attracted new tourists, including hiking trails, motocrossing, repelling and other trips orientated towards the more adventurous;
 Beach of Cabeça Gorda;
 Beach of Bairro Fundeiro
 Beach of Aldeia do Mato

Economy
Between 50-60 percent of the lands in the parish remain dedicated to cultivation of trees for harvesting, primarily pine but gradually eucalyptus, for its rapid growth.

Architecture

Civic
 Fountain of São João
 Fountain of São José

Religious
 Cross of Aldeia do Mato, located in the Largo da Cruzeiro, it was reconstructed during the 20th century;
 Church of Santa Maria Madalena, constructed in the 18th century and dedicated to Mary Magdalene, it was reconstructed during the 20th century (beginning of May 1991) and inaugurated in January 1993;
 Church of Carreira do Mato, dedicated to the Sacred Heart of Mary, located in Carreira do Mato, and constructed from a historic chapel on the same site;
 Church of Pucariça

Culture
The region is known for its culinary; in addition to several restaurants, the local peoples of the region are known for their  broas de santos and bolo de fugas.

Locally, the annual festival season is marked by the festival of Aldeia do Mato (on the last weekend of July), Cabeça Gorda (the second weekend of August), and the festival of Carreira do Mato (fourth weekend in August).

References

Former parishes of Abrantes